Massive Retaliation is a 1984 American film directed by Thomas A. Cohen. It includes the film debut of Bobcat Goldthwait as quirky redneck antagonist Ernie Rust.

The movie has been compared to The Shelter by Rod Serling, which it somewhat resembles in terms of story-line and subject matter.

Plot
When word comes of nuclear war between the USA and Russia in the Middle East comes out, three families leave their homes in the city and head to a survivalist outpost.

References

External links

1984 films
1980s war films
American science fiction war films
Films about nuclear war and weapons
1980s English-language films
1980s American films